was a key fortress of the Republic of Ezo in 1868–1869. It was located at the entrance of the bay of Hakodate, in the northern island of Hokkaidō, Japan.

Benten Daiba was built by the Japanese architect Takeda Ayasaburō on the site formerly occupied by a shrine to Benten, the goddess of fortune. Much of the remnants of the famous Shinsengumi fought their last battle and surrendered there.

Benten Daiba is located near Goryokaku, the famous fortress which was the site of the last battle of the Boshin War.

Forts in Japan
Boshin War
Tourist attractions in Hokkaido
Buildings and structures in Hokkaido
Coastal fortifications
19th-century fortifications in Japan